ARLS may refer to:

Library systems
Athens Regional Library System, in Athens, GA.
Azalea Regional Library System, in Central GA